The first Wüst cabinet was the state government of North Rhine-Westphalia between 2021 and 2022, sworn in on 28 October 2021 after Hendrik Wüst was elected as Minister-President of North Rhine-Westphalia by the members of the Landtag of North Rhine-Westphalia. It was the 25th Cabinet of North Rhine-Westphalia.

It was formed after the resignation of Minister-President Armin Laschet, and was a continuation of the coalition government of the Christian Democratic Union (CDU) and Free Democratic Party (FDP) formed after the 2017 North Rhine-Westphalia state election. Excluding the Minister-President, the cabinet comprised twelve ministers. Eight were members of the CDU, three were members of the FDP, and one was an independent politician.

The first Wüst cabinet was succeeded by the second Wüst cabinet on 29 June 2022.

Formation 
The previous cabinet was a coalition government of the CDU and FDP led by Minister-President Armin Laschet of the CDU. He announced his resignation after being elected to the Bundestag in the 2021 German federal election. Laschet was the CDU/CSU's Chancellor candidate in the election, and stated he would take up his seat in the Bundestag even if he did not become Chancellor. Since the constitution of North Rhine-Westphalia prohibits members of the Bundestag from serving concurrently in the state government, he was obliged to resign as Minister-President.

On 5 October, Laschet proposed transport minister Hendrik Wüst his successor. He was subsequently elected uncontested as chairman of the North Rhine-Westphalia CDU on 23 October, receiving 98% approval. Laschet resigned on 25 October 2021, a day before the constituent session of the Bundestag.

Wüst was elected as Minister-President by the Landtag on 27 October, winning 103 votes out of 197 cast.

Composition

External links 
</ref>

References 

Politics of North Rhine-Westphalia
State governments of Germany
Cabinets established in 2021
Cabinets disestablished in 2022
2021 establishments in Germany
2022 disestablishments in Germany
Cabinets of North Rhine-Westphalia